Shawn Gallant (born October 14, 1976 in Windsor, Ontario) was a Canadian football defensive back for the Winnipeg Blue Bombers of the Canadian Football League. He was drafted by the Saskatchewan Roughriders in the second round of the 2000 CFL Draft. He played college football at Eastern Kentucky University. 

In 2011, Gallant retired from professional football to join the Winnipeg Police Service. He is now working as a constable with the department.

Gallant has also played for the Ottawa Renegades and Montreal Alouettes.

External links
Retirement announcement

1976 births
Living people
Canadian football defensive backs
Canadian football linebackers
Eastern Kentucky Colonels football players
Montreal Alouettes players
Ottawa Renegades players
Players of Canadian football from Ontario
Saskatchewan Roughriders players
Sportspeople from Windsor, Ontario
Winnipeg Blue Bombers players